Caixa Eletronica (February 23, 2005 – January 4, 2014), was an American thoroughbred racehorse and winner of three graded stakes in 2012, at the age of seven.

His sire, Arromanches, was not a stakes-winner and stood for just US$1000 in Indiana, but was also exceptionally durable, racing 78 times in eight seasons. He assembled a nine-race winning streak as an eight-year-old.

Caixa Eletronica performance as a racehorse improved with age, winning his first graded races in 2012.  He won the richest race of his career, the 9 furlong, US$1,000,000 Charles Town Classic in April of that year, defeating the previous year's winner, Duke of Mischief. On May 28, he finished fourth behind Shackleford in the one-mile Metropolitan Handicap. He ran back just 12 days later to score a late-charging victory in the True North Handicap, making up more than 14 lengths to win by three-quarters of a length in the six-furlong contest. Caixa Eletronica next tried nine furlongs in the Whitney Invitational at Saratoga on August 4, but faded to eighth. In the September 1st Forego Stakes at 7 furlongs, he finished fourth. Returning to six furlongs at Belmont on September 29, he closed to finish second to The Lumber Guy in the Vosburgh Stakes. After a 7th-place finish in the Bold Ruler Handicap on October 27, he carried 133 pounds to a commanding four-length victory in the Fall Highweight Handicap. He raced in second place behind This One's For Phil for much of the six-furlong contest before drawing off under a hand ride. The win brought his 2012 earnings to US$1,116,000 in 12 races.  January 4, 2014 Caixa Eletronica was in a training accident at Belmont Park. Six Drivers, a 4 year old, got loose and collided with 9 year old Caixa Eletronica head on. Both horses died instantly Six Drivers fractured his neck while Caixa Eletronica fractured his skull.

References

2005 racehorse births
2014 racehorse deaths
Racehorses bred in Kentucky
Racehorses trained in the United States
Thoroughbred family 13-c